Wyoming Highway 116 (WYO 116) is a  north–south state highway located in central Weston and southern Crook counties of the U.S. state of Wyoming. It travels from WYO 450 south of Upton north to U.S. Route 14 (US 14) in Sundance.

Route description
Wyoming Highway 116 begins its southern end south of Upton on Wyoming Highway 450 approximately half-way in between Wright and Newcastle. Highway 116 heads north through central Weston County, and turns northeast to Upton. Highway 116 turns northwest and overlaps US 16 for a short distance through Upton, before leaving US 16 for its own routing, along Ash Street, toward Sundance.

Route 116 continues to travel northerly, but as it nears the Crook County line, turns east and runs roughly parallel to it before turning north and crossing into Crook County. Highway 116 continues toward Sundance as it travels through the south-central part of the county. Exit 185 on Interstate 90  lies just west of Highway 116's northern terminus and Wyoming Highway 585 can be reached by turning east onto I-90 Business and U.S. Route 14 into Sundance.

History
WYO 116 has had three major routings from 1926 to the present.
The first routing of WYO 116 was commissioned around 1926 and was related to old US 116. US 116 traveled from US 310 at Lovell east to US 87E at Ranchester over modern-day US 14A and US 14. The connection would be a short routing along US 87E between Ranchester and Sheridan (Modern-day US 14 between Greybull and Burgess Junction was then known as WYO 416). The first designation lasted only 10 years and was decommissioned in 1936.

In 1936, US 116, WYO 116, and US 420 were redesignated as US 14. WYO 416 then became WYO 520. In 1940, WYO 116 was revived to replace WYO 316 between Midwest–Edgerton and Gillette along modern day WYO 387 and WYO 59. This lasted until 1945, when the current routings of WYO 59 and WYO 387 emerged.

Major intersections

References

Official 2003 State Highway Map of Wyoming

External links 

Wyoming State Routes 100-199
WYO 116 - I-90 Bus/US 14 to US 16
WYO 116 - US 16 to US 16
WYO 116 - US 16 to WYO 450

Transportation in Weston County, Wyoming
Transportation in Crook County, Wyoming
116
U.S. Route 14